Dieter Klaußner (born 1 June 1938) is a German former professional footballer who played as a defender.

References

Living people
1938 births
Footballers from Karlsruhe
German footballers
Association football defenders
Bundesliga players
Karlsruher SC players
20th-century German people